Throughout World War II, the Empire of Japan  created a number of puppet states that played a noticeable role in the war by collaborating with Imperial Japan. With promises of "Asia for the Asiatics" cooperating in a Greater East Asia Co-Prosperity Sphere, Japan also sponsored or collaborated with parts of nationalist movements in several Asian countries colonised by European empires or the United States.

British Empire and Commonwealth

Burma 

The Japanese invaded Burma because the British had been supplying China in the Second Sino-Japanese War along the Burma Road. Burmese nationalists known as Burma Independence Army hoped for independence. They were later transformed into the Burma National Army as the armed forces of the State of Burma. Minority groups were also armed by the Japanese, such as the Arakan Defense Army and the Chin Defense Army.

Hong Kong 

Hong Kong was a British crown colony before its occupation by the Japanese. During the Japanese rule, former members of the Hong Kong Police Force, including Indians and Chinese, were recruited into the Kenpeitai police force.

India 

Most were supporters of the exiled nationalist and former president of the Indian National Congress Subhas Chandra Bose. The Royal Italian Army formed a similar unit of Indian prisoners of war, the Battaglione Azad Hindoustan. A Japanese-supported puppet state Azad Hind was also established with the Indian National Army as its military force.

Malaya 

After occupying British Malaya, Japanese occupation authorities reorganized the disbanded British colonial police force and created a new auxiliary police. Later on, a 2,000-men strong Malay Volunteer Army and a part-time Malay Volunteer Corps were created. Local residents were also encouraged to join the Imperial Japanese Army as auxiliary Heiho. There was a Railway Protection Corps as well.

Straits Settlements 

The British territory of the Straits Settlements (Singapore, Malacca, Penang and Dindings) came under Japanese occupation after the fiasco suffered by Commonwealth forces at the Fall of Singapore. The Straits Settlements Police Force came under the control of the Japanese and all vessels owned by the Marine Police were confiscated.

China 

The Japanese had previously set up several puppet regimes in occupied Chinese territories. The first was Manchukuo in 1932, under former Chinese emperor Puyi, then the East Hebei Autonomous Government in 1935. Similar to Manchukuo in its supposed ethnic identity, Mengjiang (Mengkukuo) was set up in late 1936. Wang Kemin's collaborationist Provisional Government was set up in Beijing in 1937 following the start of full-scale military operations between China and Japan, and another puppet regime, the Reformed Government of the Republic of China, in Nanjing in 1938.

The Wang Jingwei collaborationist government, established in 1940, "consolidated" these regimes, though in reality neither Wang's government nor the constituent governments had any autonomy, although the military of the Wang Jingwei regime was equipped by the Japanese with planes, cannons, tanks, boats, and German-style stahlhelm, which were already widely used by the National Revolutionary Army, the "official" army of the Republic of China.

The military forces of these puppet regimes, known collectively as the Collaborationist Chinese Army, numbered more than a million at their height, with some estimates that the number exceeded 2 million conscriptees. Many collaborationist troops originally served warlords of the National Revolutionary Army who had defected when facing both Communists and Japanese. Although the collaborationist army was very large, its soldiers were very ineffective compared to NRA soldiers, and had low morale because they were considered "Hanjian". Some collaborationist forces saw battlefields during the Second Sino-Japanese War, but most were relegated to behind-the-line duties.

The Wang Jingwei government was disbanded after the Japanese surrendered to Allies in 1945, and Manchukuo and Mengjiang were destroyed in the Soviet invasion of Manchuria.

French Indochina 

Japanese soldiers primarily used Laos to stage attacks on Nationalist China.

On 22 September 1940, Vichy France and the Empire of Japan signed an agreement allowing the Japanese to station no more than 6,000 troops in French Indochina, with no more than 25,000 troops transiting the colony. Rights were given for three airfields, with all other Japanese forces forbidden to enter Indochina without Vichy's consent. Vichy signed the Joint Defense and Joint Military Cooperation treaty with Japan on 29 July 1941. It granted the Japanese eight airfields, allowed them to have more troops present, and to use the Indochinese financial system, in return for a fragile French autonomy.

The French colonial government had largely stayed in place, as the Vichy government was on reasonably friendly terms with Japan. The Japanese permitted the French to put down nationalist rebellions in 1940.

The Japanese occupation forces kept French Indochina under nominal rule of Vichy France until March 1945, when the French colonial administration was overthrown, and the Japanese supported the establishment of the Empire of Vietnam, Kingdom of Kampuchea and Kingdom of Laos as Japanese puppet states. Vietnamese militia were used to assist the Japanese. In Cambodia, the ex-colonial Cambodian constabulary was allowed to continue its existence, though it was reduced to ineffectuality. A plan to create a Cambodian volunteer force was not realized due to the Japanese surrender. In Laos, the local administration and ex-colonial  (Indigenous Guard, a paramilitary police force) were re-formed by Prince Phetsarath, who replaced its Vietnamese members with Laotians. The Hmong Lo clan supported the Japanese.

Netherlands East Indies (Indonesia) 

Some Indonesians initially welcomed the Japanese as liberators. Among Indonesians to receive Japanese imperial honours from Hirohito in November 1943 were Sukarno and Mohammad Hatta. Sukarno actively recruited and organised Indonesian Rōmusha forced labour. They respectively became the founding President of Indonesia and Vice President of Indonesia in August 1945.

Philippines (U.S. commonwealth) 

The Second Philippine Republic was a puppet state established by Japanese forces after occupying the Philippines, which relied on the re-formed Bureau of Constabulary and the Makapili militia to police the occupied country and fight the local resistance movement and the Philippine Commonwealth Army. The president of the republic, Jose P. Laurel, had his presidential guard unit that was recruited from the ranks of the collaborationist government. When the Americans closed in on the Philippines in 1944, the Japanese began to recruit Filipinos, who mostly served in the Imperial Japanese Army and actively fought until Japan's surrender. After the war, members of Makapili and other civilian collaborators were subject to harsh treatment by both the government and civilians, because their actions had led to the capture, torture, and execution of many Filipinos.

Portuguese Timor 
Portugal was neutral during the war, but its colony in Timor was occupied by the Japanese to expel Australian troops. The Japanese used the population for forced labor. Local militiamen were organized into "black columns" to help Japanese forces fight Allies.

Foreign volunteers for the Japanese Army

The Japanese recruited volunteers from several occupied regions and from among POWs.

References

Empire of Japan
Former Japanese colonies
Japanese military occupations